PDZ and LIM domain protein 4 is a protein that in humans is encoded by the PDLIM4 gene.

References

Further reading